The 29th Women's Boat Race took place on 14 March 1974. The contest was between crews from the Universities of Oxford and Cambridge and held on The Isis.

Background
The first Women's Boat Race was conducted on The Isis in 1927.

Race
The race took place on a  stretch of The Isis.  The contest was won by Cambridge by half a length in a time of 4 minutes 8 seconds.  The victory took the overall record in the competition to 19–10 in their favour.

See also
The Boat Race 1974

References

External links
 Official website

Women's Boat Race
1974 in English sport
Boat
March 1974 sports events in the United Kingdom
1974 in women's rowing